Ryan Harrison was the defending champion, but chose not to participate.

Go Soeda won the title, defeating Robby Ginepri in the final 6–3, 7–6(7–5).

Seeds

Draw

Finals

Top half

Bottom half

References
 Main Draw
 Qualifying Draw

Honolulu Challenger - Singles
2012 Singles